Kamal Ahmadi (also Romanized as Kamāl Aḩmadī) is a village in Bord Khun Rural District, Bord Khun District, Deyr County, Bushehr Province, Iran. At the 2006 census, its population was 19, in 5 families.

Populated places in Deyr County